Michael Hill and Daniel Vacek were the defending champions but did not compete that year.

Bob Bryan and Mike Bryan won in the final 6–4, 6–3 against Chris Haggard and Robbie Koenig.

Seeds
Champion seeds are indicated in bold text while text in italics indicates the round in which those seeds were eliminated. All eight seeded teams received byes to the second round.

Draw

Final

Top half

Bottom half

External links
 2003 Open SEAT Godó Doubles Draw

Doubles
2003 ATP Tour